George R. Tweedie was a businessman who gained fame in 1891 by running a popular magic lantern show, titled "Gossip about Ghosts". The show, which cost sixpence, consisted of fifty slides, each illustrating a story about ghosts or supernatural occurrences. One concerned  George Villiers, 1st Duke of Buckingham, who supposedly appeared as a ghost to a king's officer to prevent the death of his son. Another touched upon the Legend of Hamilton Tighe, a murdered man who haunted his murderers in headless form.

The show was quite popular and received a positive review in the Pall Mall Gazette.

He later ran a second show, titled "Gossip about fairies".

Tweedie was formerly an instructor at the Royal Polytechnic Institution in London.

References 

 

1857 births
Year of death uncertain
19th-century English businesspeople